Charles Buck may refer to:

Charles F. Buck (1841–1918), American politician
Charles Buck (minister) (1771–1815), English theologian
Sapiah (1840–1936), Ute leader who also used the name "Charles Buck"
 Charles Neville Buck (fl. 1879–1932), American writer
 Sir Charles Buck (c. 1692–1729), the third Baronet Buck
 Sir Charles Louis Buck (1722–1782), the fourth Baronet Buck
 Charles William Buck, American ambassador to Peru, father of Charles Neville Buck
Rinker Buck (born 1950), author born "Charles Rinker Buck"

See also
The Charles Buck House, a historic building in Stoneham, Massachusetts
The Charles Amos Buck House, a historic building in Stevensville, Montana